Porzio is an Italian surname that may refer to:

Alfredo Porzio (1900–1976), Argentinian boxer 
Camillo Porzio (1526–1580), Italian historian
Francesco Porzio (born 1966), Italian water polo player
Giovanni Porzio (1873–1962), Italian politician and lawyer
Lorenzo Porzio (born 1981), Italian rower
Mike Porzio (born 1972), American baseball player
Nino Porzio (born 1972), Italian singer and actor
Pino Porzio (born 1967), Italian water polo player
Simone Porzio (1496–1554), Italian philosopher

Italian-language surnames